Porcupine is a census-designated place in Sioux County, North Dakota, United States. It lies only a few minutes' drive from the city of Selfridge. The community includes the headquarters of the Selfridge/Porcupine district.

An unincorporated community, it was designated as part of the U.S. Census Bureau's Participant Statistical Areas Program on March 22, 2010. It was not counted separately during the 2000 Census, but was included in the 2010 Census, where a population of 146 was reported.

Geography

Demographics

Transportation
The only access to the town is B.I.A Road 7 from North Dakota State Highway 6.

Education
It is in the Fort Yates School District, which is integrated with Standing Rock Community School.

References

Census-designated places in Sioux County, North Dakota
Census-designated places in North Dakota
Unincorporated communities in North Dakota
Unincorporated communities in Sioux County, North Dakota